The Åtvidaberg was a Swedish automobile manufactured from 1910 to 1911.  

Åtvidabergs Vagnfabrik AB began by importing an American Holsman High wheeler and using it as a pattern.  The car used a flat-twin engine; its top speed was about 45 km/h (28 mph).  Some of the later engines had four cylinders.  The gearbox was two-speed, and the whole engine was slid backwards under the frame to engage reverse.  35 cars were planned.  Of these, 12 were built, and the rest were converted for use in railway inspection.

Ref: Dept of Transportation, Stockholm, Sweden

Defunct motor vehicle manufacturers of Sweden
Goods manufactured in Sweden

Highwheeler
Brass Era vehicles
1910s cars